Olē Kittnër (born 15 October 1987) is a German former professional footballer who played as a defender.

Career
Born in Münster, Kittner began 1993 his career with SC Münster 08 and signed 2005 with the youth team of LR Ahlen. He made his debut in the first team for LR Ahlen on 20 November 2006 against Borussia Mönchengladbach II and his professional debut for Rot Weiss Ahlen in the 2. Bundesliga on 28 November 2008 against TuS Koblenz.

On 4 June 2010, after five years, he left Rot Weiss Ahlen and signed a two-year contract for TuS Koblenz.

References

1987 births
Living people
Sportspeople from Münster
Association football defenders
German footballers
Rot Weiss Ahlen players
TuS Koblenz players
SV Sandhausen players
SC Preußen Münster players
2. Bundesliga players
3. Liga players
Footballers from North Rhine-Westphalia